Santa Barbara is an Italian village and hamlet (frazione) of the commune of Ceraso in the Province of Salerno, Campania. It has a population of roughly a thousand.

History 
The village was founded around the year 1005.  It counts a little castle, ancient seat of the local marquesses Ferolla.

Geography 
Santa Barbara is located in the middle of Cilento and transcluded into its national park, 3 km south of Ceraso, on the provincial road from Vallo della Lucania to Ascea, and nearby the green area of Gelbison mountain. It counts a little locality named Isca nearby the little river Fiumarella.

The village is 7 km far from Vallo della Lucania, 16 from Ascea, 18 from Velia, and almost 80 from Salerno. Nearby the town of Ceraso there is an exit of a modern carriageway, rapid variation on national road SS 18, which runs from Salerno to Sapri through Battipaglia, Paestum, Agropoli, Vallo della Lucania,  Centola and Policastro.

See also 
 Cilento
 Cilentan dialect
 Cilento and Vallo di Diano National Park

References

External links 

  Comune of Ceraso
  History of S.Barbara (on galcasacastra.it)

Frazioni of the Province of Salerno
Localities of Cilento